Alcides Castilho Maia was a Brazilian journalist, politician, novelist and essayist. He was born in São Gabriel on September 15, 1878. His father, Henrique Maia de Castilho, was a federal employee. Carlinda de Castilho Leal, his mother, was the daughter of Manuel Coelho Leal, owner of the Jaguari ranch, in the municipality of Lavras do Sul, and also two fractions of the field in São Gabriel, called Tarumã and Guabiju. Alcides Maia spent his childhood on the Jaguari ranch, the setting for many of his regionalist works, especially in the novel Ruínas vivas, which was in essence a nostalgic vision of his ancestor's ranch. Alcides moved to Porto Alegre, where he completed secondary studies. In 1895, when he was 18 years old, he entered the Faculty of Law in São Paulo. His true vocation, however, was literature and journalism, which led him to drop out of law school. Returning to Porto Alegre in 1896, he devoted himself to the practice of activist, even militant, journalism, an activity he would carry out throughout his life.

In journalism, he distinguished himself through his cultural and political engagement, at outlets like A Reforma and A República. At age 19 he published his first book Pelo Futuro. His newspaper articles from 1898 to 1900 were collected in a volume. In addition to working in newspaper editorial offices, he had contact, in Porto Alegre, with the celebrated polygrapher Apolinário Porto Alegre. In 1903, Alcides Maia made his first trip to Rio de Janeiro, where his name was already well-known. From then on, he began to live and work, alternately, in both Rio de Janeiro and Porto Alegre. In Rio, he made the acquaintance of Machado de Assis. 

From 1905 onwards, he became busier in the Rio de Janeiro press, writing in O País, O Imparcial, Correio da Manhã and Jornal do Comércio. He also signed articles under the pseudonym Guys. In 1908, he returned to Porto Alegre, driven by a very ambitious motivation: the founding of a newspaper, Jornal da Manhã. It only lasted a year, but a valuable part of Alcides Maia's journalistic output remained in its collection. Back in Rio, he lived the best years of his journalistic and literary career. In 1910, he published his only novel, Ruínas vivas, which he would compose, with the short story books Tapera (1911) and Alma bárbara (1922), his regionalist trilogy, which reflects the poetry of the pampas, seeking in the past the roots of its people. Other great moments in his career took place in 1912, with the publication of an essay on Machado de Assis, and, in the following year, with his admission to the Brazilian Academy of Letters. By this time he was the librarian of the Pedagogium.

He represented Rio Grande do Sul in the Chamber of Deputies, in the legislative period from 1918 to 1921. From 1925 to 1938, he lived in Porto Alegre, with a brief trip to Rio, as a result of his participation in the revolutionary movement of 1930. There, he directed the Júlio de Castilhos Museum, until he retired, and wrote for Correio do Povo. Driven by a lifelong restlessness, he returned to Rio, where he lived the last years of his life (1938-1944), writing for Correio do Povo and attending the Brazilian Academy of Letters when he could. But always missing the Rio Grande, he returned there five years after his death, when his remains were transferred to the Panteon Riograndense, in Porto Alegre. He died in Rio de Janeiro on October 2, 1944.

He was the second occupant of chair 4 of the Brazilian Academy of Letters, to he was elected on September 6, 1913, in succession to Aluísio Azevedo and received on July 21, 1914 by the academic Rodrigo Otávio. He in turn received academic Gregorio da Fonseca.

References

1878 births
1944 deaths
Brazilian writers